The Journal of Marketing is a bimonthly scholarly journal that publishes peer-reviewed research in marketing. It is published by the American Marketing Association. Established in 1936, It is the fourth-oldest major journal covering marketing issues; the others are Harvard Business Review (1920), Journal of Retailing (1925), and Journal of Business (1928).

Editors 

Hari Sridhar, Joe Foster ’56 Chair in Business Leadership and is Research Director of the Sales Leadership Institute at Mays Business School at Texas A&M University is Editor in Chief.
He works with 3 coeditors, approximately 48 associate editors and an editorial review board to manage the journal's peer review and publication.

Special issues 
The journal has published special issues on various topics over the years, including one on mapping the boundaries of marketing that was sponsored by the Marketing Science Institute.

Awards 
The journal presents three article-focused honors on an annual basis. The AMA/MSI/H. Paul Root Award honors the best article from the most recent volume, the Hunt/Maynard Award honors recent contributions to marketing theory, and the JM/Jagdish Sheth Foundation honors articles that have made long-term impact.

References

English-language journals
Marketing journals
Publications established in 1936
Bimonthly journals
Academic journals published by learned and professional societies